Blymhill and Weston-under-Lizard is a civil parish in the district of South Staffordshire, Staffordshire, England.  It contains 61 listed buildings that are recorded in the National Heritage List for England.  Of these, five are listed at Grade I, the highest of the three grades, and the others are at Grade II, the lowest grade.  The parish contains the villages of Blymhill, Weston-under-Lizard, Brineton, Great Chatwell, and Orslow, and the surrounding countryside.  Much of the parish is occupied by the country house Weston Hall and its estate, Weston Park.  The house and many structures within the estate are listed.  Most of the other listed buildings are houses, cottages, farmhouses and farm buildings, the earlier of which are timber framed or have timber famed cores.  The other listed buildings include churches, memorials in the churchyards, and a public house


Key

Buildings

References

Citations

Sources

Lists of listed buildings in Staffordshire
South Staffordshire District